Gordon Kenneth Stephen Leckie is a Scottish businessman. He was appointed Lord Lieutenant of Perth and Kinross (the Queen's representative in the region) in 2019, having previously been Deputy Lieutenant since 2012.

Leckie is chief executive of the Crieff Hydro family of hotels, chairman of the Scottish Tourism Alliance and the president of the Scottish Chambers of Commerce (SCC).
Previously the president of the Perthshire Chamber of Commerce. He also chairs the Scottish Government’s tourism leadership group, responsible for the national tourism strategy, Tourism Scotland 2020.

References 

Lord-Lieutenants in Scotland
Year of birth missing (living people)
Living people
British hoteliers
21st-century Scottish businesspeople